Bertram McDougall (17 January 1890 – 10 January 1951) was an Australian rules footballer who played with Collingwood in the Victorian Football League (VFL).

Notes

External links 

		
Bertie McDougall's profile at Collingwood Forever

1890 births
1951 deaths
Australian rules footballers from Victoria (Australia)
Collingwood Football Club players